Jérémie Flemin (born 15 November 1991) is a retired French-Polish ice dancer.

Career

Partnership with Plutowska 
Flemin teamed up with Polish ice dancer Justyna Plutowska in May 2016. They decided to represent Poland and debuted their partnership at the 2016 CS Lombardia Trophy, finishing 6th. The two are coached by Barbara Fusar-Poli and Stefano Caruso in Milan, Italy.

Plutowska/Flemin withdrew after the short dance from the 2017 Four Nationals due to a hernia in his back. In 2018 they achieved silver at Polish nationals.

In June 2018 Plutowska/Flemin moved to Montreal, where they are coached at Gadbois Centre by Romain Haguenauer, Patrice Lauzon and Marie-France Dubreuil.

On October 11, 2019 he officially received Polish citizenship, enabling him participation in the Olympic Games.

Programs

With Plutowska

Competitive highlights
''CS: Challenger Series

With Plutowska

References

External links 
 

Polish male ice dancers
Swiss male ice dancers
French male ice dancers
1991 births
Living people
Sportspeople from Vaucluse